Per Aunet (born 14 April 1940, in Stjørdal) is a Norwegian politician for the Socialist Left Party, an environmentalist in the Norwegian Society for the Conservation of Nature (NNV) and an Associate Professor in biology at Nord-Trøndelag University College.

He was elected to the Norwegian Parliament from Nord-Trøndelag in 1989, but was not re-elected in 1993. Aunet was a member of Levanger municipality council in the periods 1975–1979, 1979–1983, 1987–1989 and 1995–1999. He chaired the local party chapter from 1984 to 1987 and from 1997 to 1999. He was deputy chairman of NNV from 1995 to 1997.

In his younger days, he was an athlete who specialized in the 400 metres hurdles. He won silver medals at the Norwegian championships in 1962 and 1968, representing the clubs IL Stjørdals-Blink and Tingvoll IL. His career-best time was 53.1 seconds, achieved in August 1968 at Bislett stadion.

References

1940 births
Living people
Members of the Storting
Socialist Left Party (Norway) politicians
Politicians from Nord-Trøndelag
Norwegian environmentalists
Norwegian University of Science and Technology alumni
University of Bergen alumni
Academic staff of Nord-Trøndelag University College
Norwegian male hurdlers
20th-century Norwegian politicians
People from Stjørdal